Flava, Latin for 'yellow', may refer to:

 Flava (radio), a New Zealand radio station
 "Flava" (song), a single from R&B singer-songwriter Peter Andre
 Flava (TV channel), a defunct British music television channel, which played classic hip-hop and R&B music videos.
 Flavor (disambiguation), in English slang

See also 
 
 Flavas, an American line of fashion dolls created by Mattel in 2003
 Flavus (disambiguation)
 Flavum (disambiguation)